Amiah Miller (born July 16, 2004) is an American actress and model. She starred in the 2017 film War for the Planet of the Apes. She also appears in the TV series Henry Danger, Best Friends Whenever and MacGyver.

Early life
Her father is Merrill Miller. Around 2014, Miller took acting training classes in Los Angeles and Orlando. Besides acting, Miller also studies Thai boxing and jujutsu.

Career
In 2017, Miller had a breakout role starring in War for the Planet of the Apes, as the character Nova. She appeared on the main promotional poster for the film. She previously appeared in Lights Out (2016), playing the young version of Teresa Palmer's character. In 2017, she had roles in Trafficked and House by the Lake. On television, she appears in Henry Danger, Richie Rich, Best Friends Whenever and MacGyver.

She often plays the young version of another character, as she did in the films Lights Out and Trafficked, and in the TV series Best Friends Whenever. 

In 2019, she appeared in the live-action-fantasy film Anastasia: Once Upon a Time.

Filmography

References

External links
 
 
 

2004 births
21st-century American actresses
American film actresses
American television actresses
Living people